Natalya Fyodorovna Simonova is a fictional character and the main Bond girl in the James Bond film GoldenEye, played by actress Izabella Scorupco.

Biography
Natalya Simonova works as a Level 2 programmer at the Severnaya facility of the Russian Space Forces, on work involving missile guidance systems. When the treasonous General Ouromov and Xenia Onatopp attack the station with a stolen Tiger helicopter, she is left the only survivor besides Boris Grishenko, who had allied himself with Ourumov and Alec Trevelyan, the plan's mastermind.

She attempts to find Boris, whom she believes to be innocent; he meets her in a cathedral and turns her over to Onatopp.

Simonova and Bond, who have both been captured by Trevelyan, are trapped in the stolen Tiger helicopter. The helicopter fires missiles at itself, but Bond is able to eject the two, who are subsequently arrested by the Russian government.

Ourumov sets Bond free to clear his own name of murder; Bond escapes, but loses Natalya in the process. He then rescues her from Ourumov and Trevelyan, and they become lovers. The two then follow Trevelyan to Cuba.

Finally, the two assault Trevelyan's satellite base, where Natalya is able to prevent the rogue satellite Mischa from sending an electromagnetic pulse to destroy London. Natalya breaks into the computer room and resets the satellite's course to cause a burn up over the Atlantic Ocean. She destroys the GoldenEye satellite and commandeers a helicopter to pick up Bond and herself by using the gun Bond gave her. Natalya saves Bond right after he defeats Trevelyan. She and Bond leave in the helicopter and get dropped off a distance away. Jack Wade was waiting for the two. He picks them up in the helicopter, ending the movie.

In an early draft of the script for the next film in the series, Tomorrow Never Dies, Bond mentioned to Wade that Natalya married a hockey player, a reference to Izabella Scorupco's real-life marriage to Polish hockey player Mariusz Czerkawski.

Featured in
 GoldenEye (1995)
 GoldenEye 007 (1997) — video game
 GoldenEye 007 (2010) — video game - She is portrayed by Kirsty Mitchell in this game

Reception
Helena Bassil-Morosow notes that "like her predecessors, Tatyana Romanova and Anya Amasova, Natalya is strong, beautiful and resilient but still needs Bond to save her." 

IGN ranked Natalya as the 7th best Bond girl, saying "she was exactly what the franchise needed to get back on top after a lengthy time away from the big screen". Allwomenstalk rank her as the 2nd sexiest Bond girl.

When addressing the video game version of Natalya, Cracked.com rated her 10th on their The 15 Most Annoying Video Game Characters (From Otherwise Great Games) stating: "If James Bond is licensed to kill, Natalya must be licensed to die. She, like the aforementioned Ashley Graham, was born with a rare genetic disorder that disables her instinct for self-preservation."

References

External links

Bond girls
Fictional Russian people
GoldenEye
Film characters introduced in 1995
Fictional programmers
Female characters in film